Maksim Lukashevich (born 28 March 1992) is a Belarusian footballer for FK Neptūnas.

Career
He started in Minsk. later he moved to Lithuania and played for Tauras Tauragė, Šilutė, Palanga and Koralas Klaipėda.

In 2020 he signed with Smorgon. However, he left in March 2020 to join 1. FK Svidník in Slovakia. However, due to the COVID-19 pandemic, he never played an official game for the club. After returning to Belarus in the summer 2020, he joined Smorgon.

In February 2021, he joined Maxline Rogachev and in the summer 2021 he returned back to Lithuania and signed with Neptūnas.

References

External links

Profile at pressball.by
Profile at lietuvosfutbolas.lt

1992 births
Living people
Belarusian footballers
Association football forwards
Belarusian expatriate footballers
FC Minsk players
FK Tauras Tauragė players
FC Rechitsa-2014 players
FK Šilutė players
FC Neman Grodno players
FC Smorgon players
FC Dnepr Rogachev players
Belarusian expatriate sportspeople in Lithuania
Belarusian expatriate sportspeople in Slovakia
Expatriate footballers in Lithuania
Expatriate footballers in Slovakia